Cupaniopsis baileyana is a species of flowering tree in the soapberry family. It is native to eastern Australia. Common names include White Tamarind and Toothed Tuckeroo. The species name honours the botanist F.M.Bailey.

The habitat is on the edge of rainforest on fertile soils, at mid to high altitudes. Sometimes also seen at lower altitudes. It can be a pioneer species, growing in areas of forest disturbance.

The range of natural distribution is from Newcastle, New South Wales to Main Range National Park, in south eastern Queensland.

Description 
A small tree, to 13 metres tall with a dense crown. The trunk is mostly round, but with flanges on some individuals. Bark is smooth, grey or brown. Small branches green, fairly smooth and thick, with leaf scars.

Compound leaves are 17 to 30 cm long with 8 to 20 leaflets. Leaflets narrow oblong or elliptic to reverse lanceolate in shape. Toothed or without teeth, 4 to 9 cm long, and 1 to 2.5 cm wide. The main midrib of the leaf is raised on both sides, as are the many lateral veins. Domatia often occur where the main leaf vein meets the lateral veins. This distinguishes this species from Cupaniopsis serrata and Cupaniopsis flagelliformis.

Flowers and fruit 

Cream flowers form on panicles in March. The fruit is reddish brown capsule with three lobes, around 2 cm in diameter. Shiny black/brown seeds are almost covered by yellow to orange coloured aril. Fruit matures from November to January.

References

baileyana
Sapindales of Australia
Trees of Australia
Flora of New South Wales
Flora of Queensland